Testudovolva ericae is a species of sea snail, a marine gastropod mollusk in the family Ovulidae, the ovulids, cowry allies or false cowries.

Description
The shell size varies between 6 mm and 14 mm

Distribution
This species is distributed in the Pacific Ocean along the Philippines, Indonesia, Malaysia, New Caledonia and Queensland, Australia.

References

 Lorenz F. & Fehse D. (2009). The Living Ovulidae - A manual of the families of Allied Cowries: Ovulidae, Pediculariidae and Eocypraeidae. Conchbooks, Hackenheim, Germany
 Rosenberg, G. 2010. Description of a new species of Prionovolva (Mollusca: Gastropoda: Ovulidae) from East Africa, with reassessment of the composition of the genus. Proceedings of the Academy of Natural Sciences of Philadelphia 159: 39–66.
page(s): 57

External links
 

Ovulidae
Gastropods described in 2002